The Concealers is the third studio album by American metal band Dååth.

"Day of Endless Light" is the only track on this album with a music video.

Track listing

Personnel 
Performers
 Sean Zatorsky - vocals
 Eyal Levi – guitar, synthesizer
 Jeremy Creamer – bass guitar
 Emil Werstler – guitar
 Kevin Talley – drums

Production
 Mike Fuller – mastering
 Jorden Haley – artwork, design
 Michael Kameron – additional lyrics, research
 Mark Lewis – engineer, mixing
 Jason Suecof – producer, engineer, mixing, sound design

References

External links 
 Dååth Album Review

2009 albums
Dååth albums
Century Media Records albums
Albums produced by Mark Lewis (music producer)
Albums produced by Jason Suecof